Aditya Birla Public School is the name of several schools operated by the Aditya Birla Group, including:

Aditya Birla Public School, Renukoot
Aditya Birla Public School, Renusagar
Aditya Birla Public School, Rehla
Aditya Birla Public School, Kotputli
Aditya Birla Public School, Dalla
Aditya Birla Public School, Rewa